Bumazhnaya Fabrika is a rural locality (a village) in Pochepsky District, Bryansk Oblast, Russia. The population was 276 in 2010. There are five streets.

Geography 
Bumazhnaya Fabrika is located 5 km southwest of Pochep (the district's administrative centre) by road. Pochep is the nearest rural locality.

References 

Rural localities in Pochepsky District